Ġbejna (plural ) is the diminutive of the Maltese word , which means "cheese"; it is synonymous with the Maltese English word "cheeselet", i.e. "little cheese". The rest of the article describes '', a type of Maltese cheeselet made in Malta and Gozo.

 is a small round cheese made in Malta from sheep milk, salt and rennet. Most sheep's milk produced in Malta is used for the production of these small cheeses.

Milk in Malta was traditionally sold by milking goats on the streets and sold immediately as is. The unpasteurised milk sold was one of the causes of the spread of brucellosis ("Maltese fever") in the late 19th to the early 20th century. Themistocles Zammit is credited with stopping the pandemic.

Prior to Malta's accession to the European Union, the EU accepted Malta's request to protect the ġbejna along with the traditional variant of ricotta.

Preparation and varieties
Ġbejna is shaped in a cheese hurdle made of dried reeds, although now plastic ones are also used. They are traditionally dried in small ventilated rooms, with windows protected by a special mesh mosquito net. It is said that in the past sea water, rather than rennet, was used as a curdling agent.
The cheese is available both from pasteurised and unpasteurised milk.

Ġbejniet are prepared and served in a variety of forms: fresh ( or ), sundried (or ), salt cured, or peppered. The fresh variety have a smooth texture and a milky flavour and are kept in their own whey in a similar manner to mozzarella. The sundried variety have a more definite, nutty almost musky taste, and are fairly hard. The peppered variety are covered in crushed black pepper and cured, after which they may be stored in oil or pickled in vinegar. Their sharp taste becomes more piquant the more they age, and they also develop a crumbly texture.

In Maltese cuisine

 are sold in fresh, dried, or cured forms and may be seasoned with pepper or other herbs. It is served deep-fried as an appetizer, cured on a mezze platter or even fresh as a filling for pasta. It is found on restaurant menus, or at a Maltese grocery or supermarket.

See also
List of cheeses

References

Maltese cheeses
Sheep's-milk cheeses
Maltese cuisine